Khanafereh District is a district (bakhsh) in Shadegan County, Khuzestan Province, Iran. The district was created in 2009. At the 2006 census, its population was 24,107, in 3,966 families.  The district has one city Khanafereh. The district has two rural districts (dehestan): Naseri Rural District and Salami Rural District.

References 

Shadegan County
Districts of Khuzestan Province
2009 establishments in Iran